The 2017 Dubai Sevens was the first tournament within the 2017–18 World Rugby Sevens Series. It was held over the weekend of 1–2 December 2017 at The Sevens Stadium in Dubai, United Arab Emirates.

Format
The teams are drawn into four pools of four teams each. Each team plays every other team in their pool once. The top two teams from each pool advance to the Cup bracket where teams compete for the Gold, Silver, and Bronze Medals. The bottom two teams from each group go to the Challenge Trophy bracket.

Teams
Fifteen core teams participate in the tournament along with one invited team, Uganda, the winner of the 2017 Africa Cup Sevens:

Pool stage
All times in UAE Standard Time (UTC+4:00)

Pool A

Pool B

Pool C

Pool D

Knockout stage

13th place

Challenge Trophy

5th place

Cup

Tournament placings

Source: World Rugby

Players

Scoring leaders

Source: World Rugby

Dream Team
The following seven players were selected to the tournament Dream Team at the conclusion of the tournament:

See also
 2017 Dubai Women's Sevens

References

2017
2017–18 World Rugby Sevens Series
2017 in Emirati sport
2017 in Asian rugby union
Dubai Sevens